The Ghanchi (Ghaanchi) are a Muslim community found in the states of Gujarat, Maharashtra and Rajasthan in India. A small number of Ghanchi are also found in the city of Karachi in Pakistan.

Origin
The Muslim Gh The towns of Godhra, Chhota Udepur, Lunawada, Kalol

Present circumstances

In Gujarat
The Ghanchi are traditionally involved in the manufacture of cooking oil. The advancement of modern technology has led the Ghanchi to take up other occupations. Many are now businessmen and have become transporters. 
From Lunawada, many Ghanchi have moved and settled into Gulf countries.

Most of the Ghanchis speak Gujarati; in Kutch they speak Kutchi and in Rajasthan, they speak Mewari.

Like other Gujarati Muslims, they follow the principle of jamat bandi and have their own association, the Ghanchi Jamat. Most Ghanchis in Karachi, Pakistan are Sunni Muslims and belong to the deobandi hanfi sub-sect.

In Rajasthan
In Rajasthan, the Ghanchi are still involved with oil pressing. A large number of the community are now cultivators. The Ghanchi of Rajasthan have a statewide caste association, the Ghanchi Jamat. They are strictly endogamous, marrying close kin, practising both parallel cousin and cross cousin marriages.

In India
Mumbai and Parbhani Maharashtra and Gujarat in India are home to a large community of Ghanchis. Many are settled in the locality of Ghanchi, as well as other parts of Ghanchi Jamatkhana in Mumbai and Gujarat.

In Pakistan
The city of Karachi in Pakistan is home to a large community of Ghanchis All District. Many are settled in the localities of Ghanchi Para, Ranchore Line, Chakiwara, Baldia, Garden East and West, PIB Colony, Malir, Gulburg, Peoples Colony and Aagra Taj Colony, as well as in Defence, gulshan & other parts of Karachi.

References

External links

 Samast Muslim Ghanchi Jamat website 

Social groups of Gujarat
Muslim communities of India
Muslim communities of Gujarat
Social groups of Sindh
Muslim communities of Rajasthan
Social groups of Rajasthan